Galbreath Field was associated with the former College Football Hall of Fame in Kings Mills, Ohio.  The 7,000–10,000 seat stadium (sources differ) was also the home of the Moeller High School Crusaders from 1980 to 2001 and the Kings High School Knights until Kings Stadium was built.

The stadium was eventually demolished. Little remains today.

References

Defunct college football venues
American football venues in Ohio
Buildings and structures in Warren County, Ohio